Deadly Target (also known as Fire Zone) is a 1994 martial arts action film directed by Charla Driver. It stars Gary Daniels, Ken McLeod, Max Gail, Byron Mann and Susan Byun.

Plot 
Hong Kong police detective Charles Prince (Gary Daniels) arrives in Los Angeles to extradite a notorious Chinese gangster back to Hong Kong for trial. But soon, his suspect escapes. With the help of renegade cop Jim Jenson (Ken McLeod) and beautiful Pai Gow dealer Diana Tang (Susan Byun), Prince tracks the ruthless gangster down. Soon, Prince, Jenson, and Tang get caught in the middle of an explosive Triad Gang War that leaves Chinatown drenched in blood and littered with bodies.

Cast 
 Gary Daniels as Charles Prince
 Ken McLeod as Jim Jenson
 Byron Mann as Chang
 Susan Byun as Diana Tang
 Max Gail as Captain Peters
 Ron Yuan as Lucky
 Lydia Look as Mei
 Aki Aleong as Xiong
 Timothy Dang as Choy
 Philip Tan as Han
 Robert Kim as Kuong
 James Wing Woo as Chen
 Rick Mali as Lee
 Bill M. Ryusaki as Zhou
 Addison Randall as Inspector
 Richard Beatty as Cop - Rick
 Wendy MacDonald as Barmaid
 Joe Kuroda as Man #1
 George Cheung as Man #2
 Al Leong as Guard
 Leo Lee as Leader
 Shakti as Lady
 Lisa Larosa as Waitress
 Chuck Borden as Terrorist
 Marta Merrifield as Court Reporter

References

External links 
 
 

1994 films
American action films
American martial arts films
1990s English-language films
1990s American films